Greer is a surname. Notable people with the surname include:

A. J. Greer (born 1996), Canadian professional ice hockey forward
Allen J. Greer, officer in the United States Army who received the Medal of Honor
Andrew Greer (born 1982), touring singer-songwriter living in Nashville, Tennessee
Andrew Sean Greer (born 1970), American novelist and short story writer
Andy Greer (born 1962), American basketball coach
Arthur Greer, 1st Baron Fairfield, PC (1863–1945), British lawyer and judge
Big John Greer (1923–1972), American blues tenor saxophonist and vocalist
Bill Greer (editor) of the Miami Herald
Billy Greer (born 1952), the current bass guitarist for the band Kansas
Bonnie Greer, OBE (born 1948), American-British playwright, novelist, critic, broadcaster
Breaux Greer (born 1976), American male javelin thrower
Brian Greer (born 1959), former Major League Baseball player
Brian Greer (ice hockey) (born 1974), Canadian professional ice hockey goaltender
Brodie Greer (born 1949), American actor
Bruce Greer (born 1961), American pianist, singer and composer
Caitlin Greer (born 20th century), American actress and voice-over artist
Charlie Greer (1946–1999), American football defensive back
Christina Greer, American political scientist 
Craig Greer (born 1964), American country music artist known professionally as Craig Morgan 
Curtis Greer (born 1957), former American football player
D. M. W. Greer (born 1957), American playwright
Dabbs Greer (1917–2007), American actor in film and TV for over 50 years
Dan Greer (1959–2003), American professional wrestler, known by ring names Danny Fargo and Dan Greer
Daniel Greer, the founder of the Yeshiva of New Haven and rapist
Darren Greer (born 1968), Canadian writer
David Greer (physician) of International Physicians for the Prevention of Nuclear War (IPPNW)
David Hummell Greer (1844–1919), American Protestant Episcopal bishop of New York
Deborah A. Greer (born 1950), senior United States senator from Michigan (Democratic Party)
Donovan Greer (born 1974), former American football cornerback
Douglas Greer (1921–2016), American child actor
Ed Greer (1865–1890), Major League Baseball player
Elijah Greer (born 1990), American middle distance runner, specializes in the 800 m
Elkanah Greer (1825–1877), general in the Confederate States Army in the American Civil War
Emily Greer of Kongregate, a mobile and PC publisher and web gaming portal
Felicia Greer, former road cyclist from Canada
Frances Greer (1917–2005), American soprano
Francis Greer KCB KC (1869–1925), British barrister and civil servant
Frank Greer (1879–1943), American rower who competed in the 1904 Summer Olympics
George Greer (born 1942), retired Florida circuit judge
Germaine Greer (born 1939), Australian feminist writer, activist and academic
Gillian Greer, New Zealand literary scholar 
Gloria Greer (1908-1931), American actress
Gordon Greer (born 1980), Scottish footballer
Hal Greer (1936–2018), American basketball player
Harry Greer (1876–1947), British businessman and Conservative politician
Henry Greer (field hockey) (1899–1978), American field hockey player, competed in the 1932 Summer Olympics
Henry Greer (politician) KCVO (1855–1933), Irish soldier, politician, and racing horse owner and breeder
Herschel Lynn Greer (1906–1976), American businessman from Nashville, Tennessee
Howard E. Greer (1921–2015), vice admiral in the United States Navy
Howard Greer (1896–1974), Hollywood fashion designer, costume designer for the cinema
Hugh Greer (1902–1963), basketball coach from 1946 to 1963
Ian Greer (1933–2015), British political lobbyist, affected by the cash-for-questions affair
Ian Greer (obstetrician) FRCP (born 1958), medical doctor, Vice-President of the University of Manchester
J. J. Greer (born 1991), American soccer player
J. Ronnie Greer (born 1952), United States District Judge in Tennessee
Jabari Greer (born 1982), former American football cornerback
 James Greer, various including: 
James Agustin Greer (1833–1904), rear admiral in the United States Navy, served during the Civil War
James Greer (born 1971), American novelist, screenwriter, musician and critic
 James Greer, a fictional Vice Admiral in Tom Clancy's novel Clear and Present Danger and the movie based upon it 
Jane Greer (1924–2001), American film and TV actress
Jane Greer (poet) (born 1953), American poet
 
Jim and Emily Greer, co-creators of Kongregate
Jeff Greer (born 1964), American politician, Democratic member of the Kentucky House of Representatives
Jesse Greer (1896–1970), American Broadway songwriter
Jim Greer (born 1962), American politician and businessman
Jo Ann Greer (1927–2001), American singer
 John Greer, various including:
John Alexander Greer (1802–1855), Texan politician, second Lieutenant Governor of Texas
John Greer (Minister) of the Free Presbyterian Church of Ulster
John Greer (sculptor), Canadian sculptor
John Michael Greer (born 1962), American author
Joseph Greer (born 1754), the Kings Mountain Messenger, told the Continental Congress in 1780 of victory over the British
Judy Greer (born 1975), American actress, model and author
Ken Greer (born 1954), Canadian guitarist and keyboardist
Kenny Greer, retired Major League Baseball pitcher
LaMarr Greer (born 1976), retired American basketball player
Lloyd Greer (1885–1952), American architect in Valdosta, Georgia during the first half of the twentieth century
Lynn Greer (born 1979), American former professional basketball player
Lynn Greer (politician) (born 1941), American politician
Michael Greer (1938–2002), American actor, comedian and cabaret performer
Miyu Greer, fictional character in My-HiME
Pamela Greer, British actress
Peter Greer (born 1975), Christian advocate for those living in poverty, president and CEO of HOPE International
Ray Greer, game designer
Rebecca Greer (born 1936), American nonfiction writer, editor of Woman's Day magazine
Ricardo Greer (born 1977), Dominican-American former professional basketball player
Richard Greer, former motorcycle speedway rider in the 1970s and 1980s
Robin Greer, American actress, noted for her roles in television soap operas
Ron Greer (Wisconsin politician)
Ronald Greer (Stargate), fictional character from the science fiction TV series Stargate Universe
Rosey Greer (born 1932), American actor, singer, Protestant minister, former professional American football player
Ross Greer (footballer) (born 1967), former Australian association football player
Ross Greer (politician) (born 1994), Scottish Green Party politician, Member of the Scottish Parliament
Rusty Greer (born 1969), former Major League Baseball outfielder
Samuel MacCurdy Greer (1810–1880), Irish politician
Sandra C. Greer (born 1945), American physical chemist at the University of Maryland, College Park and Mills College
Simon Greer (born 1968), American labor and community organizer and social change leader
Skip Greer, vocalist for the Dead Kennedys
Sonny Greer (1895–1982), American jazz drummer and vocalist known for his work with Duke Ellington
Steven M. Greer (born 1955), American retired physician and ufologist
Stuart Greer (born 1959), American character actor
Stubby Greer (1920–1994), player, coach and manager in Minor League Baseball
Terry Greer (born 1957), former professional American and Canadian football player
Thomas Greer, various including:
Thomas Greer (footballer) (1889–1912), Scottish professional footballer
Thomas Greer (MP) (1837–1905), Irish Conservative politician
Thomas Greer (senator) (1853–1928), unionist politician in Northern Ireland
Tommy Greer (born 1983), Australian former professional basketball player
William Greer (1909–1985), agent of the U.S. Secret Service, driver when President John F. Kennedy was assassinated
William Greer (bishop) (1902–1972), Anglican Bishop
William C. Greer (died 2001), American politician from Maryland
Zack Greer (born 1986), Canadian professional lacrosse player

See also
Greer (disambiguation)
Greer (given name)